Siri Myrvoll (29 June 1944 – 1 May 2012) was a Norwegian politician for the Liberal Party.

She served as a deputy representative to the Parliament of Norway from Hordaland during the term 1993–1997. In total she met during 9 days of parliamentary session. 

She was the director for cultural heritage in Bergen from 1993 until 2011, when she fell ill. She was also a board member of the Organization of World Heritage Cities for four years. She died in May 2012.

References

1944 births
2012 deaths
Deputy members of the Storting
Liberal Party (Norway) politicians
Hordaland politicians
Civil servants from Bergen